Henry St. John may refer to:

Henry St John (MP for Stockbridge) (c. 1568–1621), MP for Stockbridge, 1589 and 1593
Sir Henry St John (MP for Huntingdon) (fl. 1621–25), English politician
Sir Henry St John, 1st Viscount St John (1652–1742), father of the 1st Viscount Bolingbroke and MP for Wootton Bassett, 1679–1700
Henry St John, 1st Viscount Bolingbroke (1678–1751), English philosopher and MP for Wootton Bassett, 1701–1708
Sir Henry St John, 2nd Baronet (1737–1784), British politician
Henry St John (British Army officer) (1738–1818), MP for Wootton Bassett, 1761 and 1802
Henry St John, 13th Baron St John of Bletso (1758–1805), British peer
Henry St. John (congressman) (1783–1869), U.S. Representative from Ohio
Henry St John, 4th Viscount Bolingbroke, 5th Viscount St John (1786–1851)
Henry St John, 5th Viscount Bolingbroke, 6th Viscount St John (1820–1899)
Henry St John (Royal Navy officer) (1837–1909), British admiral
Henry St John, 18th Baron St John of Bletso (1876–1920), English peer

See also
Henry St. John Cooper (1869–1926), English author
John Creasey (1908–1973), who used the pen name Henry St. John Cooper
Viscount Bolingbroke, for several other Viscounts Bolingbroke named Henry St John